Christopher Harry Jones (born 18 April 1956) is a former professional footballer who played for Tottenham Hotspur, Manchester City, Crystal Palace, Charlton Athletic, Leyton Orient and represented the England Under 21 national team on one occasion.

Football career
Jones joined Tottenham Hotspur as an apprentice in May 1973. The forward played a total of 185 matches including 19 substitute appearances and scored 42 goals in all competitions. Jones has the distinction of being a member of the 1977 relegated and the 1978 promoted teams during his career at the club. He joined Manchester City in September 1982 in a £110.000 transfer deal. Jones featured in just three games before leaving Maine Road to join Crystal Palace in the November of the same year. Jones played in 18 matches and scored three times for Palace. He transferred to Charlton Athletic in September 1983 where he appeared on 23 occasions plus six as a substitute, scoring twice. Jones ended his senior career at Leyton Orient where played in 107 matches including one as substitute, scoring 19 goals between September 1984–86.

Post-football career 
Jones retired from Leyton Orient in 1988, mainly due to a long-standing ankle injury. After retirement, he returned to Jersey with his family, where he established the Chris Jones Soccer School teaching football to Jersey's youth.

References

External links 
Fact file
Photo of Chris and career details

1956 births
Living people
Jersey footballers
Association football forwards
England under-21 international footballers
English Football League players
Tottenham Hotspur F.C. players
Manchester City F.C. players
Crystal Palace F.C. players
Charlton Athletic F.C. players
Leyton Orient F.C. players
English footballers